"If I Told You That" is a song by American singer Whitney Houston. It is the fifth track from her fourth studio album, My Love Is Your Love, which was released in November 1998 by Arista Records. A reworked duet version of the song with British singer George Michael was released on June 5, 2000, as the third single from Houston's first greatest hits album, Whitney: The Greatest Hits (2000). The remix was originally to feature Michael Jackson. Commercially, "If I Told You That" peaked at number one in Iceland, Croatia, and Poland while peaking at nine on the UK Singles Chart.

Critical reception
Larry Flick from Billboard wrote that "whatever magic might be found in this effort most certainly is going to come from the fine vocal performances. Houston scats and offers shout-outs that give "If I Told You That" a spontaneity and energy [...], while Michael still stands tall as one of the finer soul men to step in front of the mike. This pairing is mightily inspired[.], adding that "the track's instrumental palette is definitely of the moment, with a driving shuffle beat and layered vocals[.] The hook is catchy enough, with a chorus that's simple and easy to sing along with." J. D. Considine of The Baltimore Sun felt that "If I Told You That" is a song on which Houston is "faking attraction with George Michael". LA Weekly in its review for Whitney: The Greatest Hits commented that "[o]n paper, the Houston-Michael coupling is inspired[.] But Michael simply adds his pinched, nasal vocals to the track [...], the result of which is two people singing at one another and daring the listener to care".
The Baltimore Sun wrote: "when she sings in "If I Told You That" about giving in to temptation and having a fling with a friend, we shouldn't suppose she's thinking of any friend in particular."

Music video
The music video directed by Kevin Bray features Houston and Michael in a nightclub, eventually meeting on the dance floor, similar to that of Mary J. Blige and Michael's UK hit "As". The US DVD single for Houston's song "Fine" includes the music video for "If I Told You That". The video is also included on George Michael's video compilation Twenty Five.

The music video on YouTube has 42 million views as of July 2022.

Live versions
Houston performed the song regularly in her set for the My Love Is Your Love World Tour in 1999, and performed the song during her four-date promotional Greatest Hits Live in 2000 and the Soul Divas Tour in 2004.

Track listings and formats
Australian maxi single
 "If I Told You That" (album version) — 4:33
 "Fine" (album version) — 3:35
 "If I Told You That" (Johnny Douglas Mix) — 4:48
 "I'm Your Baby Tonight" (Dronez Mix) — 5:05

European maxi single
 "If I Told You That" (album version) — 4:33 	
 "If I Told You That" (Johnny Douglas Mix) — 4:48 	
 "Fine" (album version) — 3:35

Promo CD single
"If I Told You That" (radio edit) — 4:05 	
"If I Told You That" (album version) — 4:38

Personnel

Produced by Rodney Jerkins for Darkchild Entertainment Inc.
Additional production: George Michael
Remix recorded by Dexter Simmons at The Hit Factory Criteria, Miami, FL
Mixed by Jon Douglas
Mix engineer: Ren Swan
All instruments: Rodney Jerkins

Charts

References

External links
 If I Told You That at Discogs

Whitney Houston songs
George Michael songs
2000 singles
2000 songs
Arista Records singles
Male–female vocal duets
Number-one singles in Iceland
Song recordings produced by George Michael
Song recordings produced by Rodney Jerkins
Songs written by Fred Jerkins III
Songs written by LaShawn Daniels
Songs written by Rodney Jerkins